Events from the year 1846 in China.

Incumbents 
 Daoguang Emperor (26th year)

Viceroys
 Viceroy of Zhili — Nergingge
 Viceroy of Min-Zhe — Yang Yizeng
 Viceroy of Huguang — Yutai
 Viceroy of Shaan-Gan — ?
 Viceroy of Liangguang — Qiying
 Viceroy of Yun-Gui — Lin Zexu, Lin Xingyuan
 Viceroy of Sichuan — Qishan
 Viceroy of Liangjiang —  Bichang (21 January 1845 - 30 April 1847)

Events 
 Banqiao District established in Fujian (now Taiwan)
 Astor House Hotel (Shanghai) (礼查饭店), established in 1846 as Richards' Hotel and Restaurant (礼查饭店) on The Bund

References

 Martin, Robert Montgomery. China, Political, Commercial, and Social, 2 vols. 1847.